Ramble in Music City: The Lost Concert is a 2021 live album from American country musician Emmylou Harris, backed by The Nash Ramblers. The recording was unearthed by James Austin of Rhino Records and represents a different sound for Harris that included a new backing band.

Reception
Writing for American Songwriter, Lee Zimmerman gave this album four out of five stars for "pristine" sound that "gives her fans and collectors an opportunity to delve into a critical chapter in Harris’ ever-shifting career" that has "depth and diversity".

Track listing
"Roses in the Snow" (Ruth Franks) – 2:33
"Even Cowgirls Get the Blues" (Rodney Crowell) – 3:09
"Beneath Still Waters" (Dallas Frazier) – 4:07
"If I Could Only Win Your Love" (Charlie Louvin] and Ira Louvin) – 2:34
"Amarillo" (Crowell and Emmylou Harris) – 2:48
"The Other Side of Life" (Alan O'Bryant) – 2:57
"If I Needed You" (Townes Van Zandt) – 3:42
"Two More Bottles of Wine" (Delbert McClinton) – 2:58
"Mystery Train" (Herman Parker) – 2:32
"My Songbird" (Jesse Winchester) – 3:28
"Wayfaring Stranger" (John Wyeth) – 3:24
"Green Pastures" (traditional) – 3:26
"Blue Kentucky Girl" (Johnny Mullins) – 3:07
"Hello Stranger" (A. P. Carter) – 3:37
"Remington Ride" (Herb Remington) – 2:46
"One of These Days" (Earl Montgomery) – 2:53
"The Boxer" (Paul Simon) – 2:54
"Born to Run" (Paul Kennerly) – 3:47
"The Price I Pay" (Bill Parker Wildes and Christopher Hillman) – 5:03
"Sweet Dreams" (Don Gibson) – 3:55
"Save the Last Dance for Me" (Doc Pomus and Mort Shuman) – 3:17
"Leaving Louisiana in the Broad Daylight" (Donovan Cowart and Crowell) – 3:19
"Boulder to Birmingham" (Bill Danoff and Harris) – 3:38

Personnel
Emmylou Harris – guitar, vocals, production (for release)
Larry Atamanuik – drums
Sam Bush – fiddle, mandolin
Roy Huskey Jr. – bass guitar
Al Perkins – dobro, banjo, vocals
Jon Randall Stewart – acoustic guitar, mandolin, vocals
Technical personnel
James Austin – production (for release)
Matt "Buster" Allen – engineering assistance
Michael Carney – art direction, design
Eric Conn – mastering at Independent Mastering
Mark Miller – engineering, mixing at Allentown Studios
Allen Reynolds – production (original recordings)
Johnny Rosen – engineering

See also
List of 2021 albums

References

External links

Page from Harris' site
Page from Nonesuch
Review from Holler Country

2021 live albums
Emmylou Harris live albums
Nonesuch Records live albums
Covers albums